The 1989 Victorian Football Association season was the 108th season of the Australian rules football competition. It was the first season since 1960 in which the Association operated as a single-division competition after having operated as a two-division competition with promotion and relegation between them for the previous 28 years. The premiership was won by the Coburg Football Club, after it defeated Williamstown in the grand final on 24 September by 20 points; it was Coburg's second premiership in a row, and its sixth and, as of 2019, last top division premiership overall.

Association membership and structure

End of Division 2 and withdrawal of Geelong West
After several years of speculation, the Association's second division was dissolved for the 1989 season and competition was re-combined into a single division, ending 28 years of partitioned competition. The future of Division 2 had been uncertain for most of the 1980s, and both the temporary competition restructure of 1982, and the proposals of the FORT review of December 1986 had sought to remove promotion and relegation between the divisions because the gap in both on-field performances and off-field viability between the strongest and weakest teams had widened. Talk of the imminent demise of Division 2 began following the folding of Waverley in March 1988, at which point the size of the Association had reduced to 17 teams; Mordialloc's withdrawal a month later reduced the size to sixteen. By the end of the year, president Brook Andersen confirmed that the 1989 season would operate as a single division; and, that while his preference was for a twelve- or fourteen-team competition, all sixteen teams would be given the opportunity to justify their positions in the competition.

The only club to withdraw between the end of 1988 and the beginning of 1989 was Geelong West. The club was heavily in debt, in large part because population growth had boosted the popularity of the Geelong Football League above that of the Association in Geelong, and it was unable to secure the $50,000 in sponsorship it needed to remain viable; and, throughout the 1980s it had been unable to field a competitive Thirds team due to difficulties in attracting juniors players willing to play in Melbourne every second week, rather than in the local Geelong competitions. The club decided that it needed to return to the local competition, where operating costs were lower, and where it would attract stronger support by performing at a more competitive level, and it formally withdrew from the Association on 27 October. The club was not permitted to join the GFL in its own right due to its proximity to the existing St Peters Football Club, but St Peters saw its own long-term viability as uncertain, so was willing to enter a merger. The resultant club was known as the Geelong West St Peters Football Club.

Consequently, the size of the Association was reduced to fifteen teams, the smallest since 1957. With fifteen clubs in one division, the Association introduced the McIntyre final five system to replace the Page–McIntyre final four system.

Uncompetitiveness of former Division 2 clubs and the withdrawal of Sunshine
During the two-division era, the Division 2 premiers had usually struggled to be competitive in their first season in the Division 1; so, in 1989, it was an unprecedented challenge for clubs who were already weak in Division 2 to adapt to playing former top division clubs in the single-division competition. The top two from the 1988 home-and-away season, Oakleigh and Werribee, were reasonably competitive, finishing with records of 8–10; but the other three clubs, Dandenong, Camberwell and Sunshine, were completely uncompetitive, and quickly risked causing embarrassment to the Association. The Association board of management began discussing plans to reduce the size of the Association to twelve teams, but the board needed a two-thirds majority in a vote of club delegates to gain the power to set the number of clubs in the competition, and the vote was only 7–8 in favour of granting the powers.

The weakest club was Sunshine. The step up from Division 2 to the combined division was too great for it to manage, and after eight games, it was winless with a percentage of 31, and had twice conceded scores in excess of 300 points. On June 8, Sunshine announced its withdrawal from the seniors and reserves competitions for the rest of the season. It intended to use the remainder of the season to regroup, secure local sponsorships, and target strong Footscray District Football League players and fringe Footscray Football Club League players to recruit a competitive playing list for the 1990 season. The club granted unconditional clearances to its players, hoping they would return to the club in 1990; and it continued to field an Under-19s team for the rest of the season, against the protests of some teams. The eight games Sunshine had played were expunged from the records, and the rest of the senior and reserves fixture was redrawn to give all teams an equal number of games. At the end of the year, Sunshine was confident that it had rebuilt itself to be a viable and competitive club; but the Association disagreed and terminated its licence permanently at the end of the season.

Camberwell and Dandenong were little more competitive than Sunshine. Camberwell defeated Sunshine, but since that game was expunged from the records, the club went on to officially finish the season winless in all three grades; its seniors conceded more than 200 points in each of its first six games of the season (excluding the game against Sunshine) and eight times overall. Dandenong's sole win for the season came against Camberwell, and it conceded 200 points six times during the year.

Premiership season
In the home-and-away season, each team played eighteen games over twenty rounds. The fixture after Round 9 was redrawn following the withdrawal of Sunshine from the senior and reserves competition (the under-19s fixture was unchanged). The top five then contested the finals under the McIntyre final five system. The primary finals venue was North Port Oval, and the grand final was played at Windy Hill.

Ladder

Finals

Awards
The leading goalkicker for the season was Ian Rickman (Williamstown), who kicked 125 goals during the season, including finals.
The J. J. Liston Trophy was won by Saade Ghazi (Williamstown), who polled 22 votes in his first season in the Association. Robert Cunningham (Oakleigh) was second with 17 votes, and Robert Mace (Frankston) was third with 14 votes.
The inaugural Fothergill-Round Medal was won by Chris Owen (Preston).
Frankston won the seconds premiership. Frankston 17.16 (118) defeated Williamstown 11.14 (80) in the grand final, held as a curtain-raiser to the Seniors Grand Final on 24 September.

Notable events

Interleague matches
In 1989, the Association competed in and won the NFL Shield, the NFL's interstate competition among the minor states, held in Tasmania over the Queen's Birthday weekend. Phil Cleary (Coburg) was coach of the Association team, and Brett McTaggart (Williamstown) was captain. Because Tasmania unexpectedly finished last in the qualifying matches, attendances and takings at later matches dropped, resulting in all six competing states losing $40,000 in expenses over the event. Rino Pretto (Oakleigh) kicked a VFA representative record of twelve goals in the grand final.

Other notable events
In November 1988, the Association signed a new control agreement with the Victorian Football League, the first agreement between the competitions since the Association's expulsion from the Australian National Football Council in 1970. Under the agreement, the two bodies reciprocally recognised each other's clearances, uncontracted players from the League could switch directly to the Association without a transfer payment, and the League would pay a delayed transfer payment to an Association club if it recruited a player who went on to play fifty VFL games.
As part of the new co-operation between the League and Association, the umpiring panels of the two competitions were consolidated into a single body. As a result, experienced League umpires Rowan Sawers and Peter Cameron officiated the Association Grand Final.
The Association increased the number of players on the field to eighteen per side in the Under-19s competition only, consistent with the national standard rules; the Seniors and Reserves continued to field sixteen per side, as they had done since 1959.
In March 1989, Association president Brook Andersen, who had been re-elected in November 1988 to serve a fifth term as president, took a paid job as the business development director at the League's Footscray Football Club. Many delegates within the Association saw this as a conflict of interest, and as a breach of the requirement for the Association's board of management to be independent, and pressure was put on Andersen to give up one of the roles; consequently, he stepped down as president on 22 March. Vice-president John Grieve, who had been on the VFA executive committee since 1975 and was a director of the Williamstown Football Club from 1973 until stepping down in 1988 as a requirement of serving on the new independent board of management, became the new president on 10 April.
The Association followed the NFL in adopting the new reportable offence of assault for the 1989 season, which was intended to apply to a severe physical attack more serious than the existing charge of striking. In Round 2, field umpire Geoff Morrow misinterpreted this new rule, incorrectly believing that the charges of assault and striking were equivalent; so, he reported both Jamie Shaw (Preston) and Saade Ghazi (Williamstown) for assault when he should have reported them for striking. Shaw and Ghazi were summarily cleared of the assault charges on this technicality, and were not forced to face striking charges because tribunal procedures did not allow for amendments to the match-day reports. Ghazi went on to win the Liston Trophy; he would have been ineligible had he been reported and suspended for striking in this match.
The Association established a new award, the Fothergill-Round Medal, awarded to the most promising young player in the Association, and named after Barry Round and Des Fothergill, who both won Brownlow Medals in the VFL before winning an Association best and fairest. The inaugural medal was presented to Chris Owen (Preston) in April 1989; the medal is now awarded at the end of the season.
In the Round 3 match between Camberwell and Sunshine, which was expunged from the record books following Sunshine's withdrawal from the Association, Sunshine led Camberwell by 45 points midway through the third quarter, before Camberwell scored the final eighteen goals of the game to win by 51 points; Camberwell 27.14 (176) vs Sunshine 18.17 (125).
Preston was almost forced into receivership during the season after its main source of income, a bingo licence, was cancelled in May. The licence was restored in October, helping the club to survive into the 1990s.
Wet weather throughout the winter turned several Association grounds into mudheaps. Coburg City Oval was one of the worst affected; Coburg could not train on the ground after mid-June, dividing its training sessions between Skinner Reserve and Coburg Lake, and it moved its Round 18 home game against Port Melbourne to Skinner Reserve; the club sought compensation from the council after estimating that the moving the match cost the club an estimated $10,000 in revenue in takings, since the game against Port Melbourne was usually one of its largest home crowds of the year. North Port Oval, which was overused due to staging both Port Melbourne home games and the televised match of the round, was also badly affected, which was one motivation for moving the Elimination Final to the Beach Rd Oval; its proximity to the competing clubs, Springvale and Frankston, was another motivation. 
The Elimination Final became notorious for its violent incidents. A total of five players were reported on twelve charges and were suspended for a combined 26 matches, including: Jeff Sarau (Frankston), who was reported five times, ordered off, suspended for eight matches, and broke Alex Marcou's (Springvale) jaw; and Robert Mace (Frankston), who was suspended for ten weeks on two charges. Neither Sarau nor Marcou played in the Association again.

See also
List of VFA/VFL premiers

References

Victorian Football League seasons
VFL